Tobyhanna is a proposed NJ Transit commuter rail station located in Coolbaugh Township, Monroe County, Pennsylvania. The station forms part of a site owned by a number of public and private entities including the Pennsylvania Northeast Regional Railroad Authority. The site is adjacent to the former Delaware, Lackawanna and Western Railroad (and later, Erie Lackawanna) station; the building remains in place and is in use as the local historical society rail museum. In spring 2021, Amtrak announced plans for potential New York-Scranton route.

History
Until 1947, Tobyhanna was a flagstop eastbound on Sundays for the Lackawanna Limited, the predecessor to the Phoebe Snow.  Through the end of the 1950s a few trains made station stops in Tobyhanna. Westbound these trains consisted of, in 1959, the Scrantonian, bound for Scranton, the Twilight, late afternoon train bound for Buffalo and an unnamed train bound for Scranton. Eastbound, service that year consisted of the Pocono Express from Buffalo, the Merchants Express from Scranton and an unnamed evening train from Scranton. Service in the last years was limited to the Twilight and the Poconos Express (these train now terminating or originating at Scranton). Passenger service ended with the discontinuing of these trains in fall, 1965.

Proposed restoration of service
The proposed restoration of passenger service would be along the Lackawanna Cut-Off, with trains to northern New Jersey and New York City. A 102-space surface parking lot will be provided at this location, and it will be situated on the vacant side and rear portions of this site. The proposed platform would be to the south of the track, north of Church Street.

References

External links
 Lackawanna Cut-Off map

Proposed NJ Transit rail stations
Railway stations in Monroe County, Pennsylvania
Former Delaware, Lackawanna and Western Railroad stations
Railway stations in the United States opened in 1908
Railway stations closed in 1970
1908 establishments in Pennsylvania
Railroad museums in Pennsylvania